The Grass Valley speckled dace (Rhinichthys osculus reliquus) occurred in a single spring-fed creek in a grassy meadow in eastern Lander County, Nevada. Specimens were collected only once, in 1938 and it was then common. The species had a distinctive speckled lower lip and silver sided body. The introduction of brook and rainbow trout to the creek is believed to be the reason for their extinction.

References

Rhinichthys
Fish of North America becoming extinct since 1500
Dace, Grass Valley speckled
Natural history of Nevada
Extinct animals of the United States
Fauna without expected TNC conservation status